Ajdin Maksumić (born 24 July 1985) is a Bosnian-Herzegovinian retired footballer who ended his career in the German amateur leagues.

Club career
Born in Konjic, SR Bosnia and Herzegovina, previously, he played for FK Igman from his hometown and FK Sarajevo.

On January 30, 2007, he transferred to Russian club FC Khimki, where he played in 9 Russian Premier League matches.

On August 28, 2008, he came back to FK Sarajevo and played in the Premier League of Bosnia and Herzegovina.  During the winter break of the 2011–12 season he left Bosnia and joined Swiss lower league side FC Staad.  In August 2012 after a successful trial he signed with Serbian club FK Sloboda Užice.

In summer 2014, he returned to his hometown club, FK Igman Konjic.

International career

In March 2007, he received his first senior call up from against Norway, but did not play.

Earlier he was a member of the Bosnian U21 team.

References

1985 births
Living people
People from Konjic
Association football midfielders
Bosnia and Herzegovina footballers
FK Sarajevo players
FC Khimki players
CS Pandurii Târgu Jiu players
FK Sloboda Užice players
NK GOŠK Gabela players
NK Zvijezda Gradačac players
FK Igman Konjic players
Premier League of Bosnia and Herzegovina players
Russian Premier League players
Liga II players
Liga I players
Landesliga players
Bosnia and Herzegovina expatriate footballers
Expatriate footballers in Russia
Bosnia and Herzegovina expatriate sportspeople in Russia
Expatriate footballers in Romania
Bosnia and Herzegovina expatriate sportspeople in Romania
Expatriate footballers in Switzerland
Bosnia and Herzegovina expatriate sportspeople in Switzerland
Expatriate footballers in Serbia
Bosnia and Herzegovina expatriate sportspeople in Serbia
Expatriate footballers in Germany
Bosnia and Herzegovina expatriate sportspeople in Germany